Atypus muralis is a mygalomorph spider from Central Europe to Turkmenistan. It is very similar to Atypus piceus, but the posterior spinnerets consist of four instead of three segments. They also build tubes that can be up to 1 m deep. Females grow to around 12 mm, while males grow to 9 mm.

References

Atypidae
Spiders of Europe
Spiders of Asia
Spiders described in 1890